Fabiano da Rosa Beltrame (born 29 August 1982), simply known as Fabiano, is a professional footballer who plays as a centre-back for Liga 1 club Persis Solo. Born in Brazil, he obtained Indonesian citizenship through naturalisation.

Honours

Club
Persela Lamongan
 Piala Gubernur Jatim: 2009, 2010
Arema Cronus
 Indonesian Inter Island Cup: 2014/15
PSS Sleman
 Menpora Cup third place: 2021
Persis Solo
 Liga 2: 2021

Individual
 Liga 2 Best XI: 2021

References

External links
 
 Fabiano Beltrame at Liga Indonesia

1982 births
Living people
People from Paraná (state)
Sportspeople from Paraná (state)
Indonesian footballers
Brazilian emigrants to Indonesia
Indonesian people of Brazilian descent
Brazilian footballers
São José Esporte Clube players
Brazilian expatriate footballers
Brazilian expatriate sportspeople in Indonesia
Expatriate footballers in Indonesia
Liga 1 (Indonesia) players
Liga 2 (Indonesia) players
Persela Lamongan players
Persmin Minahasa players
Persija Jakarta players
Arema F.C. players
Madura United F.C. players
Persib Bandung players
PSS Sleman players
Persis Solo players
Association football defenders
Naturalised citizens of Indonesia